Galabets may refer to several places:

Galabets (tunnel), a railway tunnel in Bulgaria
Galabets, Burgas Province, a village in Burgas Province, Bulgaria
Galabets, Haskovo Province, a village in Haskovo Province, Bulgaria